Begum Abida Ahmed (17 July 1923 – 7 December 2003) was an Indian politician, First Lady of India from 1974 to 1977, and the wife of the fifth President of India Fakhruddin Ali Ahmed (1974–1977). She was twice member of the Lok sabha from Bareilly parliamentary constituency of Uttar Pradesh in 1980 and 1984.

Early life
She was born on 17 July 1923 at Sheikhupur, Badaun, Uttar Pradesh to Mohammad Sultan Hyder 'Josh'. Abida was educated from the Women's College, Aligarh and the Aligarh Muslim University, Aligarh.

Career
 Abida was member of Lok Sabha, elected twice from Bareilly (Lok Sabha constituency), Uttar Pradesh.
 She founded  the society named "God's Grace" which was registered with the Registrar of Societies under the Indian Societies Registration Act.
 She was member of India Islamic Cultural Centre (IICC), a society registered in April 1981.
 She formed Humsub Drama Group in 1974 for Urdu theatre.

Tributes

Shamsul Hasan made a life-size statue of "Ghalib", which had been ordered by Ahmed.

A train was named after her: the Abida Begum Express: Delhi Jn. - Raxaul. It has since been renamed. It is now called Satyagrah Express.

See also
 First ladies and gentlemen of India

References

External links
 8th Lok Sabha: Members Bioprofile Lok Sabha website.

20th-century Indian Muslims
1923 births
2003 deaths
India MPs 1980–1984
India MPs 1984–1989
Indian National Congress politicians from Uttar Pradesh
Aligarh Muslim University alumni
First ladies and gentlemen of India
People from Bareilly
People from Budaun district
Lok Sabha members from Uttar Pradesh
Women in Uttar Pradesh politics
20th-century Indian women politicians
20th-century Indian politicians
People from Barabanki district